Black Hearts & Jaded Spades is the third album by English hard rock band Tokyo Blade. It was originally released in 1985 on Tokyo Blade own record label and in the same year reissued by SPV/Steamhammer. The keyboard-laden compositions of this album and the strongly down-tuned guitar sound, marks the complete detachment of the band from their new wave of British heavy metal roots. It was interpreted as an attempt to conquer the American and Japanese markets, where glam and pop metal acts dominated the charts, but to no avail.

The album was reissued on a remastered CD edition in 2002 and 2008 by Razar Ice Records and in 2009 by Lost And Found Records, with four additional tracks.

Track listings
All tracks by Vicki James Wright and Andy Boulton, except "Make It Through the Night" by Boulton, Wright and John Wiggins
Side one
"Dirty Faced Angels" – 3:27
"Make It Through the Night" – 4:00
"Always" – 3:33
"Loving You Is an Easy Thing to Do" – 3:39
"Undercover Honeymoon" – 4:19
"You Are the Heart" – 4:57

Side two
"Blackhearts and Jaded Spades" – 3:55
"Tough Guys Tumble" – 3:26
"Dancing in Blue Moonlight" – 4:21
"Playroom of Poison Dreams" – 5:20
"Monkeys Blood" – 3:05
"The Magic Roundabout" – 0:45

Additional track listing (2009 reissue)
"Undercover Honeymoon" (remix)
"Stealing the Thief"
"Playroom of Poison Dreams" (remix)
"Bottom End"

Personnel

Tokyo Blade
 Vicki James Wright – lead vocals, harmonica
 Andy Boulton – lead guitar, backing vocals
 John Wiggins – lead guitar
 Andy Wrighton – bass, backing vocals
 Steve Pierce – drums

Additional musicians
 Nick Coler – keyboards

Production
Ian Richardson – producer

References

External links
  Official Lost and Found Records Website

Tokyo Blade albums
1986 albums
SPV/Steamhammer albums